TRAI (Telecom Regulatory Authority of India) is a statutory body set up by the Government of India.

TRAI or Trai may also refer to:

People
Trai is a masculine given name which has its root in Middle English. Notable people with the name include:

Trai Byers (born 1983), American actor
Trai Essex (born 1982), American footballer
Trai Hume (born 2002), Northern Irish footballer
Trai Turner (born 1993), American footballer

Other uses
Trai Thien Air Cargo, Vietnamese cargo airline

See also